The Filmfare Best Supporting Actress Award is and award presented annually by the Filmfare magazine as part of its annual Filmfare Awards South for Kannada films. It is given in honor of an actress who has delivered an outstanding performance in a supporting role while working within the Kannada film industry. Although the awards for Kannada films started in 1970, awards for the best supporting actress category started only in 2007. At the 54th Filmfare Awards South ceremony held in 2007, Leelavathi was the first winner of this award for his role in Kannadada Kanda.

Since its inception, the award has been given to ten different actresses. With three nominations including one win, Tara has been the most nominated. As of the 2017 ceremony, Bhavani Prakash is the most recent winner in this category for her role as Bobby in Urvi.

Superlatives

Winners and nominees

In the following table, the years are listed as per Filmfare convention, and generally correspond to the year of film's theatrical release; the ceremonies are always held the following year.

References

Filmfare Awards South (Kannada)